The track bed or trackbed is the groundwork onto which a railway track is laid. Trackbeds of disused railways are sometimes used for recreational paths or new light rail links.

According to Network Rail, the trackbed is the layers of ballast and sub-ballast above a prepared subgrade/formation (see diagram). It is designed primarily to reduce the stress on the subgrade.

Other definitions include the surface of the ballast on which the track is laid, the area left after a track has been dismantled and the ballast removed or the track formation beneath the ballast and above the natural ground.

The trackbed can significantly influence the performance of the track, especially ride quality of passenger services.

See also 
 Embankment (transportation)
 Roadbed
 Subgrade

References

Fills (earthworks)
Permanent way